The first elections for the Delhi Metropolitan Council were held in Indian National Capital Territory of Delhi in February 1967. L. K. Advani of the Bharatiya Jana Sangh was sworn in as the Chairman of the Council.

On 1 November 1956, under States Reorganisation Act, 1956, Delhi was converted from a state to a Union Territory. This resulted in the dissolution of the Delhi Legislative Assembly. In September 1966, with the passing of The Delhi Administration Act, 1966, the Delhi Metropolitan Council came into being, with 56 elected and five nominated members with the Lt. Governor of Delhi as its head. The Council however had no legislative powers, only an advisory role in the governance of Delhi. This set up functioned until 1990.

Results

Executive Council members

See also 
 1967 elections in India

References

Delhi
Elections in Delhi
Local elections in Delhi
Autonomous district council elections in India
1960s in Delhi